Ahmed Souaiaia is a professor at the University of Iowa with joint appointments in the Department of Religious Studies, International Studies, and College of Law. His research and teaching focus on women in Islam, human rights law, religion and politics, religion in the public sphere, political dissent in Islam, women in Islamic law, Islamic political theory, and modern Islamic thought.

Works

Souaiaia is the author of several books. He has published numerous articles in refereed journals including the Journal of Law and Religion, Muslim World Journal, Journal of Women in the Middle East and the Islamic World, and Muslim World Journal of Human Rights. His commentaries and columns appeared in Asia Times, Eurasia Review, Monthly Review, The Open Democracy Foundation for the Advancement of Global Education, Foreign Policy In Focus, and other regional and international media. He is also the founder and managing editor of Mathal (a Journal of Islamic and Middle Eastern Multidisciplinary Studies).

Books
Souaiaia, Ahmed E. Muslims and the Western Conception of Rights.  Routledge, 2021.
Souaiaia, Ahmed E. Anatomy of Dissent in Islamic Societies: Ibadism, Rebellion, and Legitimacy. New York, NY: Palgrave Macmillan, 2013.
Souaiaia, Ahmed E. Contesting Justice Women, Islam, Law, and Society. Albany: State University of New York Press, 2008.  In 646 libraries according to WorldCat

References 

 http://clas.uiowa.edu/religion/people/ahmed-e-souaiaia
 https://ahmed.souaiaia.com/
 http://www.opendemocracy.net/author/ahmed-e-souaiaia
 http://works.bepress.com/souaiaia/
 http://ir.uiowa.edu/mathal/editorialboard.html

Year of birth missing (living people)
Living people
Religious studies scholars
University of Iowa faculty

American Muslims